Bath City Council was a non-metropolitan district in Avon, England, that administered the city of Bath, Somerset, from 1974 until 1996. The district council replaced the pre-1974 county borough council.

Elections were first held on 10 May 1973, with the authority taking effect on 1 April 1974. Following the second election to the district council, the election saw terms of councillors extended from three to four years with subsequent elections for the council taking place in thirds, and the last such election was in 1994. On 1 April 1996, the city council was abolished when it was merged with Wansdyke District Council to form the new unitary authority of Bath and North East Somerset.

Political control
From the first election to the council in 1973 until its abolition in 1996, political control of the council was held by the following parties:

Council elections

1973 election
1976 election
1978 election
1979 election
1980 election
1981 election
1983 election
1984 election
1986 election
1987 election
1988 election
1990 election
1991 election
1992 election
1994 election

City result maps

References

 
Politics of Bath, Somerset
Council elections in Somerset
District council elections in England
Council elections in Avon